Pandu is a locality in Guwahati with nearest airport at Guwahati Airport and railway station at Paltan Bazaar. It is named after Pandunath Temple located in Tilla hills part of locality.  It is situated north of Maligaon locality and have Brahmaputra river to north. Due to its location on shores of Brahmaputra river, it is major hub of river transport facilities with a port managed by port authority of India.

See also
 Beltola
 Bhetapara
 Chandmari
 Ganeshguri

References

Neighbourhoods in Guwahati